"Swearin' to God" is a song written by Bob Crewe and Denny Randell. It was recorded by Frankie Valli and released in May 1975 as a single from his album Closeup.
It is a love song whose lyrical hook is a more literal use of the expression "I swear to God" (i.e., "I mean this sincerely"):

 I'm swearin' to God / So glad He's givin' me you

The first Valli song to incorporate the disco style (it runs four minutes as a single but just over ten minutes on the album),
"Swearin' to God" features Patti Austin singing a response to Valli's praise in the bridge.
"Swearin' to God" hit number 6 on the U.S. Billboard charts and also charted #31 in the UK.

Cash Box said of the edited single version that "Frankie's distinct vocal delivery meets a big, brassy arrangement and the result is a song that will surely skyrocket to the top."

Chart history

Weekly charts

Year-end charts

References 

1975 singles
Frankie Valli songs
1975 songs
Private Stock Records singles
Songs written by Denny Randell
Songs written by Bob Crewe